Oiron is a former commune in the Deux-Sèvres department in western France. On 1 January 2019, it was merged into the new commune Plaine-et-Vallées.

The Château d'Oiron is located there.

See also
Communes of the Deux-Sèvres department

References

External links

 Town council website

Former communes of Deux-Sèvres